DXKR (95.5 FM), broadcasting as Retro 95.5, is a radio station owned and operated by UM Broadcasting Network through its licensee Mt. Apo Broadcasting System. The station's studio is located at the UMBN Media Center, C. Bangoy St. cor. Palma Gil St., Davao City, and its transmitter is located along Broadcast Ave., Shrine Hills, Matina, Davao City.

Background

1993-2009: WRocK
DXKR was established in 1993 as 95.5 WRocK. It was formerly owned by ACWS - United Broadcasting Network.

On October 6, 2008, Manila Broadcasting Company purchased WRocK Manila for PhP229.6 million. However, ACWS-UBN and sister company Exodus continued to retain control of the WRocK provincial stations.

2009-present: Hit Radio/Retro
In February 2009, UMBN transferred its airtime lease agreement to 95.5 after its agreement with RBN's 100.3 expired, hence rebranding the station as 95.5 Hit Radio.

On January 1, 2016, Hit Radio rebranded as Retro 95.5, named after its sister station in Cebu. At the same time, months after ACWS-UBN was acquired by a new group of investors, UMBN acquired the station. Due to broadcast ownership guidelines, its frequency license was assigned to UMBN's sister company Mt. Apo Broadcasting System.

References

External links
95.5 Hit Radio Website

Oldies radio stations in the Philippines
Radio stations established in 1993
Radio stations in Davao City